The following is a timeline of the history of the city of Clarksville, Tennessee, United States.

18th-19th centuries

 1784 - Town platted; named Clarksville after military leader George Rogers Clark.
 1788 - Blockhouse (fort) built.
 1794 - November 11: "Native American attack repulsed at blockhouse."
 1796 - Town becomes seat of newly formed Montgomery County.
 1800 - Religious "revival at Red River" held near Clarksville.
 1815 - Clarksville Chronicle newspaper in publication.
 1820 - James E. Elder becomes mayor.
 1822 - First Presbyterian Church founded.
 1830
 Tobacco stemmery in business.
 Post House built (approximate date).
 1846 - Clarksville Female Academy chartered.
 1850 - Stewart College active.
 1855 - City of Clarksville incorporated.
 1860 - Memphis, Clarksville and Louisville Railroad begins operating.
 1868 - Labor strike of the Memphis, Clarksville and Louisville Railroad.
 1869 - Clarksville Tobacco Leaf newspaper begins publication.
 1875 - Southwestern Presbyterian University active.
 1878
 Fire.
 County courthouse constructed.
 1882 - Madison Street Methodist Church built.
 1888 - Star newspaper begins publication.
 1889 - Times newspaper begins publication.
 1890
 Clarksville Evening Tobacco Leaf-Chronicle newspaper in publication.
 Population: 7,924.

20th century

 1905 - Herald newspaper begins publication.
 1910 - January 6: Snowstorm.
 1919 - First Woman's Bank established.
 1922 - Confederate Monument installed in Greenwood Cemetery.
 1923 - Public library established.
 1925 - Southwestern Presbyterian University moves from Clarksville to Memphis.
 1927 - Austin Peay Normal School founded.
 1928 - Capitol Theatre in business.
 1937 - January: Flood.
 1940 - Population: 11,831.
 1941
 WJZM radio begins broadcasting.
 Roxy Theatre in business.
 1942 - U.S. military Camp Campbell begins operating near Clarksville.
 1954 - WDXN radio begins broadcasting.
 1955 - Sunset Drive-In cinema in business.
 1959 - Clarksville-Montgomery County Public Library active.
 1960
 Clarksville–Montgomery County Regional Airport active.
 Athlete Wilma Rudolph of Clarksville wins gold medal at 1960 Summer Olympics.
 1970 - Population: 31,719.
 1984 - Clarksville Montgomery County Museum established.
 1990 - Population: 75,494.
 1999 - January 22: Tornado.
 2000 - Population: 103,455.

21st century

 2003 - Marsha Blackburn becomes U.S. representative for Tennessee's 7th congressional district.
 2010 - Population: 132,929.
 2011 - Kim McMillan becomes mayor.

See also
 Clarkville history
 List of mayors of Clarksville, Tennessee
 National Register of Historic Places listings in Montgomery County, Tennessee
 Timelines of other cities in Tennessee: Chattanooga, Knoxville, Memphis, Murfreesboro, Nashville

References

Bibliography

 
 
 
 
 . (Includes information about Clarksville)
 
 
 
 
 
 
   (Includes information about Clarksville)

External links

 
 Items related to Clarksville, Tennessee, various dates (via Digital Public Library of America)
 
 

Clarksville, Tennessee
Clarksville